Orautoha is a valley and rural community in the Ruapehu District and Manawatū-Whanganui region of New Zealand's North Island.

Bill McNie was the original settler of the valley. McNie built a house in the valley in 1924, using newspaper as wallpaper. It later became workers' accommodation and then shearers' housing after his death in 1961, before being renovated into a rural bach his grand-nephew. The bach, on an active beef and sheep farm, was voted one of the best in the country in 2017.

The area currently consists of several farms on rugged land, with residents having to face regular electrical outages.

Education

In 2019, students from the school helped plant a new walkway along Makotuku River.

References

Populated places in Manawatū-Whanganui
Ruapehu District